Gregorio Bellocco (born 1956 in Rosarno) is an Italian criminal and a member of the 'Ndrangheta. He is the boss of the Bellocco 'ndrina from Rosarno in Calabria. He was a fugitive since 1996 and included in the list of most wanted fugitives in Italy until his capture in February 2005.

The Bellocco clan is one of the most powerful groups in the 'Ndrangheta. Activities ranged from drug trafficking, extortion, and the control of nearly all commercial businesses in the Gioia Tauro plain. Jointly with the Pesce clan and in collaboration with the Piromalli-Molè 'ndrina they controlled the public contracts for the construction of the container terminal in the port of Gioia Tauro.

He succeeded his cousin Umberto Bellocco – arrested in 1993 – as the acting boss of the clan until, he was arrested in a pre-dawn raid on 16 February 2005, while hiding in an underground bunker. A Carabinieri official said police had been hunting Bellocco for a long time. “He ruled from his territory, moving from tunnels and bunkers,” he said. He has to serve time on several convictions, including a life sentence for murder. He was succeeded by his cousin Giuseppe Bellocco.

References

1956 births
Living people
Bellocco 'ndrina
'Ndranghetisti
People from the Province of Reggio Calabria
'Ndranghetisti sentenced to life imprisonment
People convicted of murder by Italy